Anna Davia (16 October 1743 – 1810), was an Italian opera singer.

Born to Osvaldo and Maddalena da Via and married to the merchant Giovanni Bernucci in Genua. She became a singer after the bankruptcy of her spouse.

In 1761, she debuted in the Italian Opera in Amsterdam, where she became a star. In 1777, she sang in Warsaw, and between 1779 and 1785, she was a celebrated primadonna in Saint Petersburg in Russia, where she achieved widespread fame and was given a contract worth a salary of 2800 rubel by Catherine the Great.

She left Russia for Italy in 1785 and retired in 1803.

References

 Bronvermelding: Anna de Haas, Davia, Anna, in: Digitaal Vrouwenlexicon van Nederland. URL: http://resources.huygens.knaw.nl/vrouwenlexicon/lemmata/data/Davia [13/01/2014]

1743 births
1810 deaths
18th-century Italian women opera singers
Women singers from the Russian Empire